National History Park is a national park in Haiti established on 1968. It is located in Milot. It was declared as a UNESCO World Heritage Site in 1982.

The park consists mainly of the ruins of the Sans-Souci Palace, the Citadelle Laferrière and the buildings at Ramiers.

Gallery

See also 
 List of national parks of Haiti

References

External links 
 UNESCO World Heritage listing for the National History Park – Citadel, Sans Souci, Ramiers 

National parks of Haiti
World Heritage Sites in Haiti